Roger Lise (born July 26, 1927 in Martinique) is a politician from Martinique who was elected to the French Senate in 1977.

References

Senators of Martinique
French people of Martiniquais descent
French Senators of the Fifth Republic
1927 births
Living people